Jean Christophe Fatio (17 November 1656 – 18 October 1720) was a Genevan engineer, politician, and natural philosopher, who became Fellow of the Royal Society in 1706.

He was the elder brother of Nicolas Fatio. He was elected F.R.S. on 3 April 1706 and published in the Philosophical Transactions (xxv. 2241–6) a description of an eclipse of the sun which he had observed at Geneva on 12 May of that year. He died at Geneva in October 1720, survived by his wife Catherine, daughter of Jean Gassand of Forealquiere in Provence, to whom he was married in 1709. He left no issue.

References

. 

Attribution

18th-century scientists from the Republic of Geneva
Politicians from the Republic of Geneva
1656 births
1720 deaths
17th-century astronomers
Fellows of the Royal Society
18th-century astronomers
17th-century scientists from the Republic of Geneva